Bettonolithus is a genus of trilobites of the Order Asaphida. It is in the family Trinucleidae.

Fossil specimens have been found in the Lower Ordovician rocks of Gilwern Hill in Powys, Wales.

Anatomical evidence suggests this Trilobite sifted organic matter on the seabed.

References

Trinucleidae
Asaphida genera
Fossils of Great Britain
Ordovician trilobites